Costruzioni Aeronautiche Tecnam is an Italian aircraft manufacturer. It was founded in 1986. The company has two primary activities: producing aircraft components for various other manufacturers, and manufacturing its own range of light aircraft.

The P present in its aircraft designations represents the Italian brothers Luigi Pascale and Giovanni Pascale, veteran aircraft designers and manufacturers who founded the company. Prior to creating Tecnam, they had been responsible for several other aviation-related activities, including the design and construction of the twin-engine Partenavia P.68. Their original intent in founding Tecnam was the production of aerospace parts on behalf of other manufacturers, which initially included American aerospace company Boeing and commuter airliner specialist ATR. When the Light Sport Aircraft market began to emerge, the brothers entered the field, first with the P92 Eaglet, which was well received.

Costruzioni Aeronautiche Tecnam operates two separate production facilities in Italy; the Casoria facility is located adjacent to Naples Capodichino Airport. The Capua facility is located adjacent to the Oreste Salomone Airport. During 2015, a sales and delivery complex was established in Sebring, Florida, United States, to support North American operators; a similar facility has been set up in Australia as well. At present, the company produces several LSA designs, as well as certificated aircraft. As of 2018, it has delivered 5,000 airplanes worldwide. It employs 250 people. The founding brothers have both died, but Luigi's nephew, Paolo, is CEO and his son, Giovanni is director of operations.

History
Tecnam have produced a range of aircraft, most suited towards the general aviation sector. Its light sport aircraft currently in production feature side-by-side twin-seat configurations, aluminum monocoque construction, and are powered by the 100 hp Rotax 912S engine. There are several models manufactured, adopting both high- and low-wing layouts, some furnished with retractable undercarriages. In some cases, one model has two different designations, one for flight under the ultralight aviation regulations, and the other for flight under general aviation regulations as a regular certified light aircraft. Many of the aircraft fall within new sub-categories of certified aircraft, e.g. the EASA VLA (very light aircraft) rules in Europe and LSA rules in the United States.

By 2005, one particular aircraft, the Tecnam P2002 Sierra, had risen to prominence in Tecnam's lineup, the company having dedicated around 70 percent of its total aircraft production capacity to manufacturing the Sierra alone. By this point, the aircraft was being produced at a rate of six per week, while the company claimed to have an order backlog spanning the following six months. Furthermore, the Sierra could also be supplied in a near 'ready to go' configuration suited to the European trainer market, which was one reported consequence of having secured its VLA certification. By mid-2005, Tecnam had reportedly completed delivery of roughly 180 Sierras.

The Tecnam P2006T, a four-seat twin engined aircraft, made its maiden flight in 2007. It is powered by a pair of 100 hp Rotax 912S piston engines, driving variable pitch propellers, and retractable landing gear.<ref>Pia Bergqvist, Tecnam Twin, Flying, September 2011, pp. 52-59.</ref> The P2006T was certified by the EASA during 2009, while Part 23 certification was issued by the Federal Aviation Administration during the following year. In addition to its general aviation usage, the P2006T can be operated in other capacities, including as a maritime patrol aircraft, a specially furnished multi-mission model has been developed for military uses.

During the late 2000s, the company also developed the Tecnam P2008, performing its maiden flight on 30 September 2008. It is notable for being the first Tecnam-built aircraft to incorporate major composite components, such as its carbon fibre fuselage. It is otherwise conventional, using a traditional strut braced high-wing monoplane configuration, being powered by a single Rotax 912ULS flat four piston engine, and furnished with a fixed tricycle undercarriage. During December 2009, the firm made its first deliveries of the P2008.Tacke, Willi; Marino Boric; et al: World Directory of Light Aviation 2015-16, page 82. Flying Pages Europe SARL, 2015.  The Tecnam P2010 is a larger, four seat derivative of the P2008.

During October 2015, the company announced that it has formed a partnership with Chinese aircraft manufacturer Liaoning United Aviation'', a division of Shenyang Aircraft Corporation, to produce the Chinese-certified P2006T at its facility adjacent to Faque Airport in China, for delivery to customers throughout the Chinese market, including Hong Kong, Macao and Taiwan. Additional aircraft, including the two-seat Tecnam P2008JC and the four-seat Tecnam P2010, shall also be produced at the same facility once certified by local authorities.

That same year, it was announced that Tecnam was working on its first jet-powered aircraft, referred to as the P-Jet; this aircraft is intended for use as a light military trainer or reconnaissance aircraft. Powered by a single engine turbofan engine, it shall feature a side-by-side seating arrangement and retractable tricycle landing gear, along with a twin rudder arrangement.

During 2017, Tecnam reportedly built around 200 aircraft; it had a target to build a similar amount during the following year. According to aerospace periodical Flight International, the firm's recent sales have been dominated by two aircraft, the four-seat P2006 and two-seat P2008. During 2018, the company stated that it is considering establishing additional production capacity, including another factory, if demand for its aircraft justifies the investment involved in undertaking such an expansion.

Throughout the 2010s, Tecnam developed their first commercial aircraft, the P2012 Traveller; it is being marketed towards the commuter airliner, VIP, cargo, parachuting and medevac sectors of the market. Publicly revealed in April 2011, and having performed its maiden flight on 21 July 2016, it received type certification from the Federal Aviation Administration during August 2019, As of 2017, the company can reportedly produce up to 40 P2012s per year. Tecnam has forecast a demand for 11,500 short-haul commuter aircraft between 2018 and 2028.

Products
 Tecnam P92 JS/LY
 Tecnam P92 Echo Super/Eaglet/Classic
 Tecnam P96 Golf
 Tecnam P2002 Sierra
 Tecnam P2004 Bravo
 Tecnam P2006T Very Light Twin
 Tecnam P2008
 Tecnam P2010
 Tecnam Astore
 Tecnam P2012 Traveller
 Tecnam P-Jet
 Tecnam P-Mentor

See also

List of Italian companies

References

External links

 

 
Aircraft manufacturers of Italy
Companies established in 1986
Italian companies established in 1986
Companies based in Campania